Pinocchio is a 2022 American musical fantasy film directed by Robert Zemeckis from a screenplay by Zemeckis and Chris Weitz. Produced by Walt Disney Pictures, Depth of Field and ImageMovers, the film is a live-action remake of Walt Disney's 1940 animated film of the same name, which is itself based on the 1883 Italian book The Adventures of Pinocchio by Carlo Collodi. It stars Tom Hanks, Cynthia Erivo, Giuseppe Battiston and Luke Evans with Benjamin Evan Ainsworth, Joseph Gordon-Levitt, Keegan-Michael Key, and Lorraine Bracco in voice roles. The story follows a wooden puppet named Pinocchio (Evan Ainsworth), who is brought to life by a blue fairy (Erivo) after being crafted by an old Italian woodcarver named Geppetto (Hanks). While the role of Pinocchio's conscience Jiminy Cricket (Gordon-Levitt) attempts to guide Pinocchio in matters of right and wrong, Pinocchio encounters a host of unsavory characters in his efforts to become a real boy.

Development of the live-action Pinocchio began in 1985, with Jim Henson and Steve Barron approached with the idea, but Disney turned down the project. Disney eventually announced the 1940's remake film in April 2015 with Peter Hedges being reported to be writing the film's script, before being replaced with Weitz in May 2017, who also went on to produce. Sam Mendes and Paul King were originally considered for directing, and Zemeckis was confirmed as director in January 2020. By November 2018, it was reported that Hanks was in early talks to play Geppetto; he passed on the project after King's departure but rejoined in August 2020. The main cast was announced in January and March 2021. Principal photography began in March 2021 before finishing the following month. Alan Silvestri, who regularly collaborated in all of Zemeckis' films, composed the score, who also wrote the new songs with Glen Ballard.

Pinocchio was released on September 8, 2022, by Disney+, as part of Disney+ Day. It received generally negative reviews from critics, who found it lacked the charm of the 1940 film and criticized the writing and deviations, though the visuals, musical score, and some of the actors' performances received praise. It received six Golden Raspberry Award nominations, including Worst Picture and Worst Actor for Hanks, and won for Worst Prequel, Remake, Rip-off or Sequel.

Plot 
In a small Italian village in 1895, a vagrant cricket named Jiminy Cricket enters the home of a widowed elderly woodcarver named Geppetto, who lives with his pet kitten Figaro and goldfish Cleo. Geppetto has completed work on a marionette based on his young deceased son, which he names Pinocchio. Before falling asleep, Geppetto makes a wish on a star.

Later that night, the star magically brings Pinocchio to life and he is soon visited by the Blue Fairy who tells him that if he acts brave, truthful and selfless, he can be a real boy. The Blue Fairy also appoints Jiminy the responsibility of being Pinocchio's conscience to teach him right from wrong. When Geppetto awakens and finds Pinocchio alive, he is at first shocked, but becomes overjoyed.

After a few days, Geppetto sends Pinocchio to school. However, Pinocchio is soon approached by con-artist fox "Honest" John and his cat partner Gideon. Honest John convinces Pinocchio that he should live a life of fame to truly be a real boy when he really plans to sell him to the puppet master Stromboli. With the help of a seagull named Sofia, Jiminy convinces Pinocchio to continue going to school, but Pinocchio is kicked out by the headmaster because he is a puppet. Pinocchio decides to go to Stromboli's after all while Honest John places a glass jar over Jiminy. Geppetto, Figaro, and Cleo go out to look for Pinocchio when he fails to come home for dinner.

At Stromboli's theater, Pinocchio befriends one of Stromboli's employees, Fabiana and her puppet Sabina. Pinocchio puts on a good show for the crowd, but Stromboli locks him in a bird cage to prevent him from ever leaving. Stromboli's coach ends up freeing Jiminy from the jar and Pinocchio has him reach the keys for the cage's lock by telling lies to make his nose grow longer.

Soon, Pinocchio is swiped up by a coach full of children driven by a charismatic Coachman, who is taking them to Pleasure Island, where misbehavior is encouraged. Once there, Pinocchio is disturbed by some of the brutality the kids display, but befriends an irresponsible boy named Lampwick and manages to enjoy the island's more appeasing attractions. Later on, Jiminy finds that all of the children have turned into donkeys and that the Coachman sells them to the salt mines with help from his Vapor Monster henchmen. Pinocchio witnesses Lampwick's transformation at a billiard hall as Pinocchio gains a donkey's ears and tail. Pinocchio and Jiminy escape the island before the Coachman and his goons can get them.

Pinocchio and Jiminy make it back to Geppetto's, but find that Sofia gave him a flyer of Pleasure Island to let him know where Pinocchio was and that he sold all of his clocks to buy a boat to go there. Pinocchio reunites with Fabiana and Sabina who tell him that Stromboli has been arrested by the Carabinieri last night and they have taken over his puppet show. They offer Pinocchio to join them, but Pinocchio declines, wanting to save his father, which makes his donkey parts disappear.

Sofia pulls a rope for Pinocchio to hold out to the sea, where they soon find Geppetto in his boat. Just as they reunite, they are swallowed by a giant sea monster named Monstro. They take refuge in a giant boat in Monstro's stomach and Pinocchio gets the idea to make him sneeze by starting a fire within him. The plan works, and Monstro sneezes them out, but he gives chase that ends with the group crashing on dry land and apparently killing Geppetto.

Believing his father has died, Pinocchio mourns over him and a magical tear falls from his eye on Geppetto, reviving him. Geppetto tells Pinocchio that despite being a puppet, he has proven himself to be a true boy at heart. As Pinocchio and Geppetto depart for home, Jiminy narrates that stories have been told of Pinocchio becoming a real boy, but doesn't confirm them, stressing that Pinocchio has a brave, honest and selfless heart, and that he's fully real to his proud and loving father.

Cast 
 Tom Hanks as Geppetto, a kind and elderly, yet lonely Italian woodcarver and toymaker who builds and raises Pinocchio as if he were his real son and dearly wishes for him to become a real boy. Geppetto created him out of grief for the death of his young son.
 Cynthia Erivo as The Blue Fairy, a wise, soft-spoken and sweet magical fairy who brings Pinocchio to life and promises to turn him into a real boy if he proves himself brave, truthful and selfless.
 Luke Evans as The Coachman, the charismatic but imposing owner and operator of Pleasure Island where unruly, rebellious children are turned into donkeys and sold to different places. He speaks with a harsh Cockney accent and is served by the Vapor Monsters. 
 Giuseppe Battiston as Stromboli, an abusive, greedy, and arrogant puppet master who intends to force Pinocchio to perform onstage to make money. He speaks with an Italian accent and curses in Italian gibberish when he gets angry, though he is called a "rascal" by "Honest" John.
 Kyanne Lamaya as Fabiana, a puppeteer who works for Stromboli. She used to be a ballerina until a leg injury ended her dancing career causing her to wear a leg brace as she works to regain her ballet skills.
 Angus Wright as Signore Rizzi, an Italian gentleman who wants to purchase one of Geppetto's clocks.
 Sheila Atim as Signora Vitelli, an Italian woman whose job is to escort children to school.
 Lewin Lloyd as Lampwick, a naughty, spoiled, mischievous and irresponsible boy whom Pinocchio befriends on his way to Pleasure Island.
 Jamie Demetriou as the headmaster who kicks Pinocchio out of his school for being a puppet stating that school is for real children and puppets belong in a puppet show.

Voices 
 Benjamin Evan Ainsworth as Pinocchio, a living wooden puppet carved by Geppetto, and brought to life by the Blue Fairy. He seeks to learn about right and wrong so that one day he'll become a real boy.
 Joseph Gordon-Levitt as Jiminy Cricket, an anthropomorphic cricket who acts as Pinocchio's "conscience" and the partial narrator of the story.
 Keegan-Michael Key as Honest John, an anthropomorphic red fox who convinces Pinocchio to go to Stromboli's puppet show. He is often accompanied by Gideon, his mute, dimwitted, bumbling and foolish, anthropomorphic cat partner and sidekick who serves as the film's comic relief.
 Lorraine Bracco as Sofia, a seagull that Geppetto knows who befriends Jiminy.
 Jaquita Ta'le as Sabina, Fabiana's marionette.
 Fred Tatasciore as Monstro, an enormous, chimeric sea monster who devours anything that crosses his path. His role is uncredited.

Production

Development 

In 1985, Jim Henson and director Steve Barron approached Walt Disney Pictures with the idea of a live-action version of Pinocchio, but Disney turned down the project. Barron still managed to make The Adventures of Pinocchio (1996), distributed by New Line Cinema. On April 8, 2015, it was announced that Walt Disney Pictures was developing a live-action adaptation of the 1940 animated film Pinocchio. Peter Hedges was reported to be writing the film's script. On May 22, 2017, it was announced that Chris Weitz will replace Hedges as a screenwriter, as well as serve as a producer, while Sam Mendes was in talks to direct the project. On November 13, 2017, Mendes stepped down as the director.

On February 20, 2018, it was announced that Paul King was set to direct the film, while Andrew Milano was announced to be co-producing the film alongside Weitz, and production was expected to begin in late 2018. Though Jack Thorne was announced to be re-writing Weitz's script, Weitz revealed on August 21, 2018, that the script was still being developed, as well as that production was set to take place in England and Italy during 2019. In November 2018, Simon Farnaby was reported to have worked on a new draft for the film. However, on January 13, 2019, it was reported that King left the film due to "family reasons", while Disney was announced to be searching for a new director for the project.

On October 18, 2019, it was reported that Robert Zemeckis was in talks to direct the film, while the film's latest version of the screenplay was reported to have been written by Weitz, King, and Farnaby, with Weitz and Milano still being attached to the project as producers. On January 24, 2020, it was reported that Jack Rapke and Jackie Levine will serve as executive producers.

Casting 

On November 29, 2018, it was reported that Tom Hanks was in early talks to play Geppetto in the film, but passed on the project after King's departure. In August 2020, Hanks rejoined the project. Hanks reportedly reached out to director Robert Zemeckis for the role after reading the script; the two have previously worked together in the films Forrest Gump (1994), Cast Away (2000), and The Polar Express (2004).  In January 2021, Luke Evans joined the cast as the Coachman and Oakes Fegley entered early negotiations to play Lampwick. Lewin Lloyd was eventually cast in the role. In March, Benjamin Evan Ainsworth was cast in the titular role, with Cynthia Erivo, Joseph Gordon-Levitt, Keegan-Michael Key and Lorraine Bracco also added. Erivo will portray The Blue Fairy, while Gordon-Levitt, Key and Bracco will voice Jiminy Cricket, Honest John and a new character, Sofia the Seagull, respectively.

Filming 
Principal photography began on March 17, 2021, in Cardington Film Studios, England, under the working title Mahogany. Filming was completed in April 2021 according to Benjamin Evan Ainswoth.

Visual effects and animation 
Moving Picture Company provided full animation and visual effects for the film. DNEG contributed a part of the virtual production.

Music 

Alan Silvestri, a recurring collaborator of Zemeckis', composed the score for the film. The song, "When You Wish Upon a Star", was performed by Cynthia Erivo as the Blue Fairy. On August 31, 2022, it was revealed that "Hi-Diddle-Dee-Dee (An Actor's Life for Me)" and "I've Got No Strings" would also be featured, along with the titles of the four new songs: "When He Was Here with Me" and "Pinocchio, Pinocchio" performed by Tom Hanks as Geppetto, "I Will Always Dance" performed by Kyanne Lamaya as Fabiana, and "The Coachman to Pleasure Island" performed by Luke Evans as the Coachman. Only four songs from the original film, "Little Wooden Head", "Give a Little Whistle," and the reprises of "Hi-Diddle-Dee-Dee" and "When You Wish Upon a Star" did not make the cut. In addition to the songs from the original film, Silvestri and Glen Ballard wrote new songs for the project. The soundtrack album was released on September 8, 2022, the same day as the film.

Marketing
On March 9, 2022, the first look at the upcoming adaptation was released, revealing that the film would be released in September of that year. The teaser trailer and poster for Pinocchio debuted on May 31, 2022, announcing the premiere date of September 8  on Disney+, coinciding with Disney+ Day.  The trailer features part of Erivo's rendition of "When You Wish Upon a Star" as well as footage of Hanks as Geppetto.  On August 22, a teaser used to promote Disney+ Day showed the first look of Pinocchio's CGI appearance, near-identical to the 1940 animated version. On August 24, 2022, the official trailer and the first-look photos for the live-action adaptation were released.  On August 29, Disney+ released a behind-the-scenes featurette that included interviews with some members of the film's cast.  On September 8, Disney+ released a second featurette which details the impact the 1940 animated version had on the film's cast and crew as well as the satisfaction it gives them to bring the story to a new generation.  On September 15, Disney+ released a third featurette which featured new interviews with composer Alan Silvestri, Benjamin Evan Ainsworth (voice of Pinocchio), Luke Evans and lyricist Glen Ballard sharing insights on their respective contributions to the film.

Release 
On October 29, 2019, it was reported that Disney was considering releasing the film on its streaming service Disney+ due to the box office failure of its 2019 remake of Dumbo, though "a theatrical release seems more likely" after the hiring of Robert Zemeckis as director. On December 9, 2020, the film was officially announced to be moving back to Disney+ instead of a theatrical release in response to the COVID-19 pandemic.

Reception

Audience viewership 
According to Nielsen, Pinocchio was the 6th most watched program across all platforms, during the week of September 11, 2022. According to streaming aggregator Reelgood, Pinocchio was the 5th most watched program across all platforms, during the week of September 17, 2022. According to Whip Media, Pinocchio was the 8th most watched film across all platforms in the United States, during the week of September 23, 2022.

Critical response 
 Metacritic assigned the film a weighted average score of 38 out of 100, based on 37 critics, indicating "generally unfavorable reviews."

Adrian Horton of The Guardian gave the film three out of five stars, saying, "A live-action take on the classic animation has effective visual moments and an impactful turn from Tom Hanks but never quite justifies its existence." Richard Roeper of the Chicago Sun-Times gave the film three stars out of four, writing, "Every frame of Pinocchio is filled with rich and lush detail — at times this almost looks like a 3-D film — and the performances, whether live action or voiced, are universally excellent." Danny Leigh of the Financial Times thought that "The animation is now so hyper-advanced, the landscape of the movie so eerily both this and that, it is easy to get confused about where reality stops and ones and zeros take over." Jennifer Green of Common Sense Media gave the film three out of five stars and felt it "boasts an impressive mix of CGI animation and live actors and settings, but the final product feels a little jumbled".

Amy Nicholson of The New York Times was critical of the script: "Geppetto [sings] about his freshly concocted dead son. Someone wished to burden the old whittler with more motivation, and tacked on a dead wife to boot." Christy Lemire of RogerEbert.com called Key's performance "by far the film's highlight", but felt other updates to the story "too often feel empty and add no insight". Alex Godfrey of Empire Magazine gave the film two stars out of five, saying, "It's hard to invest much in Geppetto and Pinocchio's relationship when they spend barely any time together. Ultimately, it's all a bit flat, and feels like an exercise. It exists because it can." In a "C" review, Christian Zilko of IndieWire wrote, "While the original story remains undeniably excellent, Pinocchio fails at re-telling it because it ignores its own advice. ... If Disney truly believed that timeless virtue and character were more important than having a shiny new exterior, this remake would never have been made." Patrick Cremona of the Radio Times thought it "never does enough to justify its own existence, failing to improve on the tremendous 1940 animation in any meaningful way." Andrew Barker of Variety was similarly negative, saying, "There may be no strings on this Pinocchio, but there isn't much of a heart in him either."

Accolades

See also 
 Guillermo del Toro's Pinocchio
 Geppetto

References

External links 

 

2020s American films
2020s children's adventure films
2020s children's fantasy films
2020s coming-of-age films
2020s English-language films
2020s musical films
2022 adventure films
2022 fantasy films
2022 films
American children's adventure films
American children's fantasy films
American children's musical films
American coming-of-age films
American fantasy films
American films with live action and animation
American musical fantasy films
Disney+ original films
Disney film remakes
Films about father–son relationships
Films about cats
Films about death
Films about fairies and sprites
Films about foxes
Films about friendship
Films about shapeshifting
Films about wish fulfillment
Films directed by Robert Zemeckis
Films not released in theaters due to the COVID-19 pandemic
Films produced by Robert Zemeckis
Films scored by Alan Silvestri
Films set in 1895
Films set in amusement parks
Films set in Italy
Films set on fictional islands
Films shot in Tuscany
Films with screenplays by Chris Weitz
Films with screenplays by Robert Zemeckis
ImageMovers films
Live-action films based on Disney's animated films
Pinocchio (1940 film)
Pinocchio films
Puppet films
Walt Disney Pictures films